An entomopathogenic fungus is a fungus that can kill or seriously disable insects.

Typical life cycle

These fungi usually attach to the external body surface of insects in the form of microscopic spores (usually asexual, mitosporic spores also called conidia). Under the right conditions of temperature and (usually high) humidity, these spores germinate, grow as hyphae and colonize the insect's cuticle; which they bore through by way of enzymatic hydrolysis, reaching the insects' body cavity (hemocoel). Then, the fungal cells proliferate in the host body cavity, usually as walled hyphae or in the form of wall-less protoplasts (depending on the fungus involved). After some time the insect is usually killed (sometimes by fungal toxins), and new propagules (spores) are formed in or on the insect if environmental conditions are again right. High humidity is usually required for sporulation.

Groups

The entomopathogenic fungi include taxa from several of the main fungal groups and do not form a monophyletic group. Many common and/or important entomopathogenic fungi are in the order Hypocreales of the Ascomycota: the asexual (anamorph) phases Beauveria, Isaria (was Paecilomyces), Hirsutella, Metarhizium, Nomuraea and the sexual (teleomorph) state Cordyceps; others (Entomophthora, Zoophthora, Pandora, Entomophaga) belong in the order Entomophthorales of the Zygomycota.

Related fungi attack and kill other invertebrates (e.g. nematodes).

Pest control
Since they are considered natural mortality agents and environmentally safe, interest in the use of entomopathogenic fungi for biological control of insects and other arthropod pests has emerged. In particular, the asexual phases of Ascomycota (Beauveria spp., Isaria spp., Lecanicillium spp., Metarhizium spp., Purpureocillium spp., and others) are under scrutiny due to traits favouring their use as biopesticides. The development of entomopathogens as pesticides depends on research into their host specificity, stability, formulation, and methods of application.

Production
Most entomopathogenic fungi can be grown on artificial media. Some require complex media, while others, like Beauveria bassiana and exploitable species in the genus Metarhizium, can be grown on starch-rich substrates such as rice or wheat grains.

Virulence
Entomophthorales are often reported as causing epizootics (outbreaks with many deaths) in nature. These fungi are virulent. The anamorphic Ascomycota (Metarhizium, Beauveria etc.) are reported as causing epizootics less frequently in nature.

Host relationship chemical cues
Entomopathogenic fungi such as Beauveria bassiana and Metarhizium anisopliae successfully infect susceptible host populations through conidia. The signaling cues between these fungi and their host targets are under investigation. The ability to sense these parasites can increase fitness for the host targets. Evidence suggests that signal recognition occurs within some hosts, but not others. For example, the ectoparasite Cephalonomia tarsalis is susceptible to B. bassiana but it cannot detect the presence of free conidia of this fungus or infected hosts. Because they cannot detect these parasites, either the host or the host's offspring become infected and/or die. In contrast, termites detect and avoid some lethal conidia strains. Other soil-dwelling insects have evolved the ability to detect and avoid certain entomopathogenic fungi.

See also
 Biopesticide
 Entomopathogenic nematode
 LUBILOSA and Desert locust for more on use of Metarhizium as a biological insecticide

References

External links
 Fungal control of insect and mite pests, from the University of Warwick
 Services and History of the ARSEF Collection
 ARS Collection of Entomopathogenic Fungal Cultures (ARSEF)
 Entomopathogenic Fungi as Effective Insect Pest Management Tactic: A Review, Hafiza Tahira Gul, Shafqat Saeed, Fawad Zafar Ahmad Khan, Applied Sciences and Business Economics, Volume 1, Issue 1, [10-18] June, 2014.

Animal fungal diseases
Insect ecology
Parasites of insects